Santee Town Center station is a station on the Green Line of the San Diego Trolley, in the San Diego suburb of Santee, California. The station currently serves as the Green Line's northeastern terminus and serves as a major park and ride station. It is located inside a shopping center on the northeast quadrant of the intersection of Mission Gorge Road and Cuyamaca Street.

History
Santee Town Center opened on August 26, 1995, as the new terminus of the East Line (renamed the Orange Line in 1997), marking the fourth segment to open on the line. The truncation was originally due to the fact that the path between Gillespie Field and Santee Town Center is single tracked, and having two lines running on that route would cause operational issues.

Until September 2005, Santee city law prohibited rail service after 9:00 p.m., meaning that most evening service terminated at El Cajon. The law was lifted in September 2005, soon after the Green Line began operation to Santee.

Station layout
There are two tracks, each served by a side platform. Trains usually board and alight passengers from one of the eastbound platforms.

See also
 List of San Diego Trolley stations

References

External links 
 Shop Santee Trolley Square, Santee, CA

Green Line (San Diego Trolley)
San Diego Trolley stations
Santee, California
Railway stations in the United States opened in 1995
1995 establishments in California